Sophie Chang and Alexandra Mueller were the defending champions, but chose not to participate.

Asia Muhammad and Taylor Townsend won the title, defeating Lucie Hradecká and Katarzyna Kawa in the final, 4–6, 7–5, [10–3].

Seeds

Draw

Draw

References
Main Draw

Boar's Head Resort Women's Open - Doubles